Todd Andrew Clodfelter (born 17 April 1957) is an American politician and Republican former member of the Arizona House of Representatives elected to represent District 10 in 2016 until he was defeated for reelection in 2018. He is also the owner of Ace Graphics.

Education
Clodfelter received a bachelor's degree in speech communications from the University of Arizona.

Elections
 2016 – Clodfelter and Democrat Kirsten Engel narrowly defeated incumbent Democrat Stefanie Mach in the general election. Clodfelter took the most votes of all three candidates, edging out Engel by 97 votes and Mach by 857 votes.
 2014 – Clodfelter and William Wildish were unopposed in the Republican primary. They were defeated in the general election by Democratic incumbents Bruce Wheeler and  Stefanie Mach with Clodfelter receiving 25.1% of the vote.
 2012 – Clodfelter and incumbent Ted Vogt were unopposed in the Republican primary. They  were defeated in the general election by Democratic incumbent Bruce Wheeler and  Stefanie Mach with Clodfelter receiving 22.6% of the vote.
 1995 – Clodfelter first ran for the legislature in 1995 losing in the Republican primary.

References

External links
 Biography at Ballotpedia

Republican Party members of the Arizona House of Representatives
Living people
Politicians from Tucson, Arizona
1957 births